The Tanjung Datu National Park is a national park located in Kuching Division, Sarawak, Malaysia. It is situated in the far west of the state and covers an area of 14 square kilometers.

See also
 List of national parks of Malaysia

References

National parks of Sarawak
Borneo lowland rain forests
Sunda Shelf mangroves